The Screaming Tunnel is a small limestone tunnel, running underneath what once was a Grand Trunk Railway line (now the Canadian National Railway), located in the northwest corner of Niagara Falls, Ontario, Canada. The actual location of the attraction is just off Warner Road. Often thought to be a railway tunnel, it was actually constructed only as a drainage tunnel so that water can be removed from the farmlands. This water would go underneath the Grand Trunk Railway and down to the valley below. Farmers used this tunnel to transport goods and animals safely underneath the busy railroad above.

A local legend recounts that the tunnel is haunted by the ghost of a young girl, who was being raped inside the tunnel and her body was burned to prevent any evidence from being found. All versions of these legends ends with the girl's screams filling up the tunnel as she was burning to death.  

The tunnel was used as a set during the filming of David Cronenberg's 1983 film adaptation of Stephen King's horror novel The Dead Zone.

References

External links 
Current Images of the Tunnel Niagara Falls Public Library (Ont.)
More Screaming Tunnel Information Weird Places to Visit
Legend of The Screaming Tunnel : Haunted Hamilton 
Screaming Tunnel | Most HAUNTED Series... Hailey Reese 
Visiting The SCREAMING TUNNEL !! Hailey Reese 
SCREAMING TUNNEL... Investigating The TRUTH Hailey Reese 
OPENING A PORTAL IN SCREAMING TUNNEL Hailey Reese 
Asking Spirit The True Story Of Screaming Tunnel The Hawk and I 
Opening A Portal! The Hawk and I 

Buildings and structures in Niagara Falls, Ontario
Railway tunnels in Ontario
Transport in Niagara Falls, Ontario